Radley railway station serves the villages of Radley and Lower Radley and the town of Abingdon, in Oxfordshire, England.

History
The station was formerly a junction station for a branch to the adjacent town of Abingdon. Opened in 1873 by the Great Western Railway, it replaced the original interchange, opened in 1856. The branch line was extended north to terminate in a bay platform at the new station.

The branch line to Abingdon was closed to passengers by the British Railways Board in 1963. The branch continued to be used by freight trains (notably for MG Cars) and sporadic passenger excursions, the last of which took place in June 1984. It was also sometimes pressed into service as an overnight stabling point for the Royal Train during royal visits to Oxfordshire, in connection with which the train is known to have stopped at  station on at least one occasion. The branch track was lifted in the late 1980s. 

The station was renovated during 2008, with a new footbridge, shelters, a new car park and increased cycle storage.

In recent years passenger traffic at Radley has grown rapidly. In the five years 2005–10 the number of passengers using the station increased by 38%.

Services
The station sees an hourly service per weekday between Didcot Parkway and Oxford. Services operate half hourly throughout peak times. With the January 2018 timetable change, services between Oxford and London Paddington were cut with these services now terminating and starting at Didcot Parkway; this is to allow Class 387 trains to operate stopping services on the line. On weekdays, there is just one train a day in each direction to and from London Paddington but some services in peak times also run to and from Reading.

Routes

References

External links

Railway stations in Oxfordshire
DfT Category F1 stations
Former Great Western Railway stations
Railway stations in Great Britain opened in 1873
Railway stations served by Great Western Railway